The Aggie Softball Complex was the home to the Texas A&M Aggies softball team from 1994 to 2018. The stadium was dedicated on March 30, 1994. The final game played in the Aggie Softball Complex was April 15, 2018, a military appreciation game, against the Kentucky Wildcats. The record attendance for the complex is 2,341, set on April 27, 2005, versus the Texas Longhorns.  Nineteen of the 20 highest attendance numbers were set during the 2005, 2006, and 2007 seasons.  The stadium has hosted NCAA Regionals in 2005, 2007, 2008, 2011, 2012, 2013 and 2017 and NCAA Super Regionals in 2007 and 2008.

The Aggie Softball team now plays in the Davis Diamond which is located nearby.

References

External links
 Aggie Athletics Aggie Softball Complex Web Page

Defunct college softball venues in the United States
Texas A&M Aggies softball venues
1994 establishments in Texas
Sports venues completed in 1994